¡Muy Divertido! (Very Entertaining!) is a studio album recorded in New York City by Marc Ribot with Los Cubanos Postizos. It was released April 25, 2000 on Atlantic Records.

Reception

AllMusic awarded the album 3 stars and the review by Steve Huey states, "Regrouping his Latin backing band Los Cubanos Postizos, Marc Ribot offers a sequel to his 1998 Arsenio Rodríguez tribute The Prosthetic Cubans in Muy Divertido! ("very entertaining"). While there are once again a few songs penned by Rodríguez, there's also a greater variety of composers represented, including three Ribot originals... Overall, it's a worthy follow-up for anyone who enjoyed the first installment".

On All About Jazz Douglas Payne wrote "eccentric downtown guitarist Marc Ribot has made a career out of being unpredictable - and never less than totally interesting ... Restless Ribot varies the menu with all sorts of spicy flavors on ¡Muy Divertido! (Very Entertaining!) , never settling in one place for longer than the fun will last. He crafts interesting uses of vocals and, most appealingly, organ to keep the whole party a little off kilter too. The first time it's a fiesta. But each time you come back - and this listener found it hard to resist - Ribot reveals some magical musical gifts here that go well beyond Cuban territories".

Track listing

Personnel 
Marc Ribot – guitars, vocals
Anthony Coleman – keyboards
Brad Jones – bass, twelve string guitar
E.J. Rodriguez – conga, percussion, vocals
Roberto Rodriguez – drums, timbales, timpani, percussion
Marcus Rojas − tuba (track 4)
Steve Nieve (track 1), Riley Osborne (tracks 8 & 10) − organ 
JD Foster- bass (track 7), producer
Andy Taub − keyboards (track 4)
Frankie Vasquez - vocals, percussion, backing vocals (tracks 2, 6 & 10)
Eszter Balint − vocals, backing vocals (tracks 1, 6 & 7)

References

2000 albums
Marc Ribot albums
Atlantic Records albums
Spanish-language albums